Sarah Hokom is an American professional disc golfer. She is a former World Champion and 2-time US Women’s Champion. Hokom is known best for her sidearm drives.

Hokom became a touring professional in 2009, and was sponsored by Discraft. She won her first PDGA National Tour (NT) event, King of the Lake, in 2011, and followed up with two additional NT wins that year, finishing in second place behind Valarie Jenkins in the Series by a single point. Hokom went on to win the World Championships in 2012. She switched sponsors in 2013 to Prodigy Disc  and won her first US Women’s Disc Golf Championship. In 2015, Hokom switched sponsors again to Legacy Discs and launched her own disc golf retail company, Cali Connection Disc Golf. In 2018 Sarah joined Team MVP and is currently sponsored by MVP Disc Sports.

Professional career

Since 2008, Hokom has won 60 professional events, including 3 majors and 6 NT events. In 2016, she won the inaugural Disc Golf Pro Tour Points Series. In 2017, she finished second in the Disc Golf Pro Tour Points Series, finishing in second place at five of the nine events, and tying for first place at the weather shorted Nick Hyde Memorial. Throughout her career Hokom has been one of the more outspoken players advocating for women in the sport and in 2017 she suggested changes to the payout structure for the Open Women's division at PDGA sanctioned events.

Major wins

National Tour wins

Summary

Annual statistics

†At Year End
‡ Includes DGPT Championship (not PDGA sanctioned)

Equipment
Hokom is sponsored by MVP discs starting in 2019.

External links

MVP Disc Sports Player Page
PDGA Player Page
Cali Connection Disc Golf

References

American disc golfers
Living people
1982 births